Malambo is a 1984 Austrian drama film directed by . The film was selected as the Austrian entry for the Best Foreign Language Film at the 58th Academy Awards, but was not accepted as a nominee.

Cast
  as Chris
 Miodrag Andrić as Mischa
 Nirit Sommerfeld as Nada
 Dietrich Siegl as Hans
 Oliver Stern as Anatol
  as Rita
 Georg Trenkwitz as Martin
 Gerhard Swoboda as Peter
 Predrag Milinković as Pero

See also
 List of submissions to the 58th Academy Awards for Best Foreign Language Film
 List of Austrian submissions for the Academy Award for Best Foreign Language Film

References

External links
 

1984 films
1984 drama films
1980s German-language films
Austrian drama films